Juliette Derricotte (April 1, 1897 – November 7, 1931) was an American educator and political activist. Her death, after being turned away from a white-only hospital following a car accident in Chattanooga, Tennessee, sparked outrage in the African-American community. At the time of her death, she was the Dean of Women at Fisk University.

Early life

Juliette Derricotte was born in Athens, Georgia, the fifth of nine children. Her parents were Isaac Derricotte, a cobbler, and Laura Derricotte, a seamstress. As a child she wanted to attend the Lucy Cobb Institute in Athens but the school was segregated and did not accept Black girls. This denial helped shape Juliette's perception of the world and her desire to change people's racial prejudices.

Education and career

Derricotte's public speaking earned her a scholarship to attend Talladega College. After graduating in 1918, she enrolled at the Young Women's Christian Association (YWCA) Training School. She became the YWCA secretary of the National Student Council, where her responsibilities included visiting colleges, planning conferences, and fostering ideas and leadership. She is credited with re-establishing the council's ideology, helping it become more balanced, open, and interracial.

In 1924, Derricotte became a member of the World Student Christian Federation and began traveling the world as a delegate representing American colleges. In 1927, she received a master's degree in religious education from Columbia University. Her travels included a seven-week trip to Mysore, India starting in December, 1928 to attend the World Student Christian Conference. Seeing British colonialism in India, she drew parallels with the subjugation of African Americans in the United States, as a growing network of African American and Indian activists were doing at that time. She wrote about the insights and inspiration she gleaned from the trip in the African American magazine, The Crisis. 

Derricotte resigned from her YWCA position in 1929 to become Dean of Women at Fisk University in Nashville, Tennessee.

Derricotte was an active member of Delta Sigma Theta and affiliated with the sorority's first graduate chapter in New York City. After her death, Delta Sigma Theta established a scholarship fund in her honor, awarded to members of the sorority employed in the social work field.

Death
In 1931, Derricotte died after a traffic accident outside of Dalton, Georgia. The car she was riding in, which was driven by another student, collided with the car of a white couple. Both Derricotte and the student were seriously injured. They received emergency treatment from white doctors but were refused admittance to the local hospital because they were black. They were moved to a local woman's house, where both died. This triggered national outrage and several investigations, including one involving the National Association for the Advancement of Colored People.

Legacy
Sue Bailey Thurman was inspired by Derricotte's ideas about learning and travel and established the Juliette Derricotte Scholarship. The scholarship enabled African-American undergraduate women with high academic achievements to study and travel abroad. One of the recipients was Margaret Bush Wilson, who revived the scholarship decades later.

Notes

Further reading

References 
 Alkalimat, Abdul (2004). The African American Experience in Cyberspace. Pluto Press. .
 Encyclopedia of World Biography
 Notable African American Women
 BlackAtlanta.net

External links 
 eBlack Studies

Student politics
American anti-racism activists
Road incident deaths in Tennessee
1897 births
1931 deaths
African-American activists
20th-century African-American women